John Norman Soulsby (6 December 1897 – June 1980) was an English professional footballer who played as a right back in the Football League for Ashington, Newcastle United and South Shields.

Personal life 
Soulsby served as a private in the Northumberland Fusiliers and the King's Own Yorkshire Light Infantry during the First World War.

Career statistics

References 

English footballers
English Football League players
Newcastle United F.C. players
1897 births
1980 deaths
British Army personnel of World War I
King's Own Yorkshire Light Infantry soldiers
Footballers from South Shields
Association football forwards
Association football outside forwards
South Shields F.C. (1889) players
Darlington F.C. players
Wallsend F.C. players
Blyth Spartans A.F.C. players
Ashington A.F.C. players
Military personnel from County Durham
Spennymoor United F.C. players
Carlisle United F.C. players
Royal Northumberland Fusiliers soldiers

People from Trimdon Grange
Footballers from County Durham